Eugène Coulon may refer to:

Eugène Coulon (athlete), French Olympic long jumper
Eugène Coulon (water polo), French Olympic water polo player